Spinning Wheel is a historic commercial building located at Asheville, Buncombe County, North Carolina. It was built in 1939, and is a one-story, "T" -shaped commercial building with three primary components.  It consists of the side-gabled, single-pen log dwelling; a small frame hyphen called the "dog-trot"; and a frame "loom room".  A cement block extension was added in 1945.  The building was restored in 1998.  The Spinning Wheel operated from 1939 to 1948 and provided education, employment, socialization, and a craft market for the traditional weaving women from the mountains around Asheville.

It was listed on the National Register of Historic Places in 1999.

References

Commercial buildings on the National Register of Historic Places in North Carolina
Commercial buildings completed in 1939
Buildings and structures in Asheville, North Carolina
National Register of Historic Places in Buncombe County, North Carolina